Nezamabad-e Jadid (also Romanized as Nez̧āmābād-e Jadīd; also known as Nez̧āmābād) is a village in Jolgah Rural District, in the Central District of Jahrom County, Fars Province, Iran. At the 2006 census, its population was 2,404, in 533 families.

References 

Populated places in Jahrom County